Jiju may refer to:

Jijū (侍従) or Chamberlains, chief functionaries of the Imperial Household Agency of Japan, see Board of Chamberlains
Jilin opera or Jiju (吉剧), a Chinese opera genre from Jilin
Jiju Township (吉居乡), a township in Kangding, Sichuan, China
Ji Ju (姬鞠,  22nd century BC?), a legendary noble of the Xia dynasty